Tanya Aparicio is a pianist from Panama; known for having won several contests in her country.

References 

a
 Article from prensa.com (in Spanish)
 Bio page from the Alfredo de Saint Malo festival (in Spanish)

Living people
Year of birth missing (living people)
Panamanian pianists
21st-century pianists